Natascha Jennifer Honegger (born 27 September 1997) is a Swiss-born Brazilian professional footballer who plays as a goalkeeper for Swiss club Basel and the Brazil national team. She also played for the Switzerland national under-19 team.

References

1997 births
Living people
People with acquired Brazilian citizenship
Brazilian women's footballers
Brazilian people of Swiss-German descent
Afro-Brazilian sportspeople
Women's association football goalkeepers
Division 1 Féminine players
Paris FC (women) players
Brazil women's international footballers
Brazilian expatriate women's footballers
Brazilian expatriate sportspeople in France
Expatriate women's footballers in France
People from Uster
Swiss-German people
Swiss women's footballers
Swiss people of Brazilian descent
Swiss expatriate women's footballers
Swiss expatriate sportspeople in France
FC Luzern Frauen players
Swiss Women's Super League players
Sportspeople from the canton of Zürich
Clube de Regatas do Flamengo (women) players
Sport Club Corinthians Paulista (women) players